Oleksiy Pavelko is a Ukrainian football player.

Career
Oleksiy Pavelko is started his career in Polissya Zhytomyr for one season then he moved to Polissya Zhytomyr for two season where he played 46 matches. In 2008 he moved for one season to Dnipro Cherkasy, Yednist Plysky and Olkom Melitopol. In 2010 he moved to Feniks-Illichovets Kalinine and to Desna Chernihiv for two season where he played 27 matches and scored 4 goals. In 2012 he moved to Naftovyk Okhtyrka until 2016 where he played 77 matches and scored 3 goals, then he played 7 matches to Helios Kharkiv. In 2017 he moved for two season in Inhulets Petrove where he played 34 matches and he played also 3 matches with Inhulets-2 Petrove.

References

External links 
 Oleksiy Pavelko footballfacts.ru
 Oleksiy Pavelko allplayers.in.ua
 

1986 births
Living people
FC Desna Chernihiv players
FC Polissya Zhytomyr players
FC Dnipro Cherkasy players
FC Yednist Plysky players
SC Olkom Melitopol players
FC Feniks-Illichovets Kalinine players
FC Naftovyk-Ukrnafta Okhtyrka players
FC Helios Kharkiv players
FC Inhulets Petrove players
FC Inhulets-2 Petrove players
Ukrainian footballers
Ukrainian Premier League players
Ukrainian First League players
Ukrainian Second League players
Association football midfielders